Savoy opera was a style of comic opera that developed in Victorian England in the late 19th century, with W. S. Gilbert and Arthur Sullivan as the original and most successful practitioners.  The name is derived from the Savoy Theatre, which impresario Richard D'Oyly Carte built to house the Gilbert and Sullivan pieces, and later those by other composer–librettist teams. The great bulk of the non-G&S Savoy Operas either failed to achieve a foothold in the standard repertory, or have faded over the years, leaving the term "Savoy Opera" as practically synonymous with Gilbert and Sullivan. The Savoy operas (in both senses) were seminal influences on the creation of the modern musical.

Gilbert, Sullivan, Carte and other Victorian era British composers, librettists and producers, as well as the contemporary British press and literature, called works of this kind "comic operas" to distinguish their content and style from that of the often risqué continental European operettas that they wished to displace. Most of the published literature on Gilbert and Sullivan since that time refers to these works as "Savoy Operas", "comic operas", or both. However, the Penguin Opera Guides and many other general music dictionaries and encyclopedias classify the Gilbert and Sullivan works as operettas.

Gilbert and Sullivan's early operas played at other London theatres, and Patience (1881) was the first opera to appear at the Savoy Theatre, and thus, in a strict sense, the first true "Savoy Opera", although the term "Savoy Opera" has, for over a century, referred to all thirteen operas that Gilbert and Sullivan wrote for Richard D'Oyly Carte.

Other definitions
During the years when the Gilbert and Sullivan ("G&S") operas were being written, Richard D'Oyly Carte also produced, at the Savoy Theatre, operas by other composer–librettist teams, either as curtain raisers to the G&S pieces, or to fill the theatre when no G&S piece was available. To his contemporaries, the term "Savoy Opera" referred to any opera that appeared at that theatre, regardless of who wrote it.

Aside from curtain raisers (which are listed in the second table below), the G&S operas were the only works produced at the Savoy Theatre from the date it opened (10 October 1881) until The Gondoliers closed on 20 June 1891.  Over the next decade, there were only two new G&S pieces (Utopia Limited and The Grand Duke), both of which had comparatively brief runs. To fill the gap, Carte mounted G&S revivals, Sullivan operas with different librettists, and works by other composer–librettist teams.  Richard D'Oyly Carte died on 3 April 1901. If the nexus of Carte and the Savoy Theatre is used to define "Savoy Opera," then the last new Savoy Opera was The Rose of Persia (music by Sullivan, libretto by Basil Hood), which ran from 28 November 1899 – 28 June 1900.

After Carte's death, his wife Helen Carte assumed management of the theatre. In 1901, she produced Sullivan's last opera, The Emerald Isle (finished after Sullivan's death by Edward German), and during the run of that opera, she hired William Greet as manager of the theatre. Later that year, she leased the theatre to Greet, who then produced Ib and Little Christina, The Willow Pattern, a revival of Iolanthe, Merrie England (1902) and A Princess of Kensington (1903), each with a cast made up largely of Carte's Savoy company. Cyril Rollins and R. John Witts adopt A Princes of Kensington as the last of the Savoy Operas. After A Princess of Kensington closed in May 1903, Mrs. Carte leased the theatre to unrelated parties until late 1906, when she produced the first of her two seasons of G&S revivals in repertory at the Savoy, with Gilbert returning to direct.

In March 1909, Charles H. Workman leased the theatre, producing three new pieces, including one by Gilbert, Fallen Fairies (music by Edward German). The last of these Workman-produced works came in early 1910, Two Merry Monarchs, by Arthur Anderson, George Levy, and Hartley Carrick, with music by Orlando Morgan. The contemporary press referred to these works as "Savoy Operas", and S. J. Adair Fitz-Gerald regarded Workman's pieces as the last Savoy Operas.

Fitz-Gerald wrote his book, The Story of the Savoy Opera, in 1924, when these other pieces were still within living memory. But over the ensuing decades, the works produced at the Savoy by composers and librettists other than Gilbert and Sullivan were forgotten or infrequently revived. The term "Savoy Opera" came to be synonymous with the thirteen extant works of Gilbert and Sullivan. The first collaboration of Gilbert and Sullivan – the 1871 opera Thespis – was not a Savoy Opera under any of the definitions mentioned to this point, as Richard D'Oyly Carte did not produce it, nor was it ever performed at the Savoy Theatre. Nevertheless, Rollins & Witts include it in their compendium of the Savoy Operas, as does Geoffrey Smith. The Oxford English Dictionary defines the phrase as: "Designating any of the Gilbert and Sullivan operas originally presented at the Savoy Theatre in London by the D'Oyly Carte company. Also used more generally to designate any of the Gilbert and Sullivan operas, including those first presented before the Savoy Theatre opened in 1881, or to designate any comic opera of a similar style which appeared at the theatre".

Complete list
The following table shows all of the full-length operas that could be considered "Savoy Operas" under any of the definitions mentioned above.  Only first runs are shown. Curtain-raisers and afterpieces that played with the Savoy Operas are included in the next table below.

Companion pieces
The fashion in the late Victorian era and Edwardian era was to present long evenings in the theatre, and so full-length pieces were often presented together with companion pieces. During the original runs of the Savoy Operas, each full-length work was normally accompanied by one or two short companion pieces.  A piece that began the performance was called a curtain raiser, and one that ended the performance was called an afterpiece. W. J. MacQueen-Pope commented, concerning the curtain raisers:

This was a one-act play, seen only by the early comers.  It would play to empty boxes, half-empty upper circle, to a gradually filling stalls and dress circle, but to an attentive, grateful and appreciative pit and gallery.  Often these plays were little gems.  They deserved much better treatment than they got, but those who saw them delighted in them. …[They] served to give young actors and actresses a chance to win their spurs…the stalls and the boxes lost much by missing the curtain-raiser, but to them dinner was more important.

The following table lists the known companion pieces that appeared at the Opera Comique or the Savoy Theatre during the original runs and principal revivals of the Savoy Operas through 1909. There may have been more such pieces that have not yet been identified.  In a number of cases, the exact opening and closing dates are not known.  Date ranges overlap, since it was common to rotate two or more companion pieces at performances during the same period to be played with the main piece.

Many of these pieces also played elsewhere (and often on tour by D'Oyly Carte touring companies). Only the runs at the Opera Comique and the Savoy are shown here.

*Indicates an approximate date.

Notes

References

Sources

Further reading

External links
The Gilbert and Sullivan Archive
List of Savoy opera curtain raisers
The Gilbert and Sullivan Discography
Gilbert & Sullivan 101, with essays, bibliography, related links, etc.
Savoynet – an email-based G&S listserv
Who Was Who in the D'Oyly Carte
Memories of the D'Oyly Carte website
Reviews of the operas

Gilbert and Sullivan
Opera genres
Comedy genres